is an open source utility to allow sending and receiving TCP and UDP packets. It also supports TCP connections using SSL, intense traffic generation, HTTP(S) GET/POST requests, and panel generation. It is available for Windows, Mac, and Linux. It is licensed GNU General Public License v2 and is free software. Packet Sender's web site says "It's designed to be very easy to use while still providing enough features for power users to do what they need.".

Uses 

Typical applications of Packet Sender include:

 Troubleshooting network devices that use network servers (send a packet and then analyze the response)
 Troubleshooting network devices that use network clients (devices that "phone home" via UDP, TCP, or SSL—Packet Sender can capture these requests)
 Testing and development of new network protocols (send a packet, see if device behaves appropriately)
 Reverse-engineering network protocols for security analysis (such as malware)
 Troubleshooting secure connections (using the SSL server and client).
 Automation (via Packet Sender's command line interface or resend feature)
 Stress-testing a device (using intense network generator tool)
 Sharing/Saving/Collaboration using the Packet Sender Cloud service

Packet Sender comes with a built-in TCP, UDP, and SSL server on multiple ports a user specifies. This remains running listening for packets while sending other packets.

Features 

As of version v8.1.1 Packet Sender  supports the following features:

 Live traffic log (Time / From IP / From Port / To IP / Method / Error / ASCII / HEX)
 Persistent TCP and SSL Connections
 HTTP Requests with Auth headers
 Portable Mode
 IPv6 Client / Server
 IPv4 Subnet Calculator
 Saved packets (with sending directly from saved list)
 Mixed ASCII packet notation (ASCII with embedded syntax to allow hex) 
 Multiple TCP servers
 Multiple UDP servers
 Multiple SSL servers
 Multicast send and receive
 Packet resending at n intervals (where n is seconds)
 Multi-threaded TCP/SSL connections
 Command-line interface
 Packet responses
 Smart Packet responses
 Macros inside packet responses for TIME, DATE, UNIXTIME, RANDOM, UNIQUE
 Packet search (for saved packets)
 Packet export/import
 Intense Traffic Generator (UDP Flooding) via GUI or CLI
 Quick-send from traffic log
 Save traffic log
 Panel Generation for scripting buttons
 Packet Sender Cloud

Platforms 

 Windows (64-bit)
 OS X (Intel-based x86-64 or M1 Macs with Rosetta 2)
 Linux (Source Distribution with Qt or x86-64 AppImage or Snap)

Packet Sender Mobile is available on iOS. It only has the core features of desktop Packet Sender (send, receive, TCP, UDP, and Cloud).

See also

 Hping
 Wireshark
 Netcat

References

External links 
 Original website
 Packet Sender source code on GitHub

Computer security software
Free network management software
Network analyzers
Unix network-related software
Windows network-related software
MacOS network-related software